The Kingdom of the Little People is a theme park near Kunming, China that features comic performances by people with dwarfism. Supporters of the park claim that it provides employment to people who would otherwise be unable to find work, but it has been criticized for treating dwarfism as a humorous condition.

Employees
As of 2010, there were over 100 employees whose ages ranged from 19 to 48. The employees live in nearby dormitories which were specifically constructed to be accessible to short people. During the performances, the actors pretend to live in small mushroom shaped houses.

The park was founded in September 2009 by Chen Mingjing, a wealthy real estate investor, as part of a complex he owns near Dian Lake in the western suburbs of Kunming that also includes the World Butterfly Ecological Park (世界蝴蝶生态园). Although many visitors to the park are students from nearby towns, Chen hopes to make the park a destination for tourists visiting China. He provides English lessons for his employees to help them interact with foreign tourists. He aims to eventually employ 1,000 people with dwarfism.

Performances
The performers sing, dance, and perform onstage for visiting tourists. They often act out Qigong, scenes from fairy tales, or ballets such as Swan Lake. They also occasionally perform hip-hop dances.

Controversy
The park has been criticized by several organizations, including the Little People of America and Humanity & Inclusion. Critics contend that the park resembles a human zoo and isolates its employees from the rest of society. Chen claims that the business provides employment for many who would otherwise be unemployed, allowing them to build self-respect. Many employees have said that they enjoy living with other short people and feel less lonely at the park. They say that before they were employed by Chen they were unable to find work or were exploited by employers. The American television channel, Vice, started partly by director Spike Jonze, filmed a piece for their show, Vice Essentials, at the Kingdom of the Little People in 2015. In their short documentary they interviewed some of the staff and were taken on a tour of the park, including the dorms and behind the scenes places that visitors are not normally privy to.

See also
Midgetville
Human zoo

References

External links
 Official Website 
 The Empire of Chinese Dwarves (video + pics)

2009 establishments in China
Amusement parks in China
Buildings and structures in Kunming
Tourist attractions in Yunnan